Castle is a town in Okfuskee County, Oklahoma, United States. A post office was established February 25, 1903, and the town was named for the first postmaster, Manford B. Castle.  The population was 106 at the 2010 census.

Geography
Castle is located at  (35.475174, -96.384072).

Castle is situated six miles northwest of the county seat, Okemah. It is close to the intersection of US-62 and SH-48.  Okemah Lake is to the northeast.

Demographics

As of the census of 2000, there were 122 people, 48 households, and 37 families residing in the town. There were 58 housing units at an average density of 328.6 per square mile (124.4/km2). The racial makeup of the town was 77.05% White, 1.64% African American, 19.67% Native American, 0.82% from other races, and 0.82% from two or more races. Hispanic or Latino of any race were 0.82% of the population.

There were 48 households, out of which 27.1% had children under the age of 18 living with them, 66.7% were married couples living together, 6.3% had a female householder with no husband present, and 22.9% were non-families. 22.9% of all households were made up of individuals, and 12.5% had someone living alone who was 65 years of age or older. The average household size was 2.54 and the average family size was 2.92.

In the town, the population was spread out, with 24.6% under the age of 18, 11.5% from 18 to 24, 22.1% from 25 to 44, 26.2% from 45 to 64, and 15.6% who were 65 years of age or older. The median age was 39 years. For every 100 females, there were 100.0 males. For every 100 females age 18 and over, there were 114.0 males.

The median income for a household in the town was $24,688, and the median income for a family was $24,688. Males had a median income of $16,250 versus $16,563 for females. The per capita income for the town was $10,261. There were 13.8% of families and 16.5% of the population living below the poverty line, including 14.7% of under eighteens and 18.2% of those over 64.

References

External links
 Oklahoma Historical Society - Castle

Towns in Okfuskee County, Oklahoma
Towns in Oklahoma